The People's Volunteer Army (PVA) was the armed expeditionary forces deployed by the People's Republic of China during the Korean War. Although all units in the PVA were actually transferred from the People's Liberation Army under the orders of Chairman Mao Zedong, the PVA was separately constituted in order to prevent an official war with the United States. The PVA entered Korea on 19 October 1950, and completely withdrew by October 1958. The nominal commander and political commissar of the PVA was Peng Dehuai before the ceasefire agreement in 1953, although both Chen Geng and Deng Hua served as the acting commander and commissar after April 1952 due to Peng's illness. The initial (25 October – 5 November 1950) units in the PVA included 38th, 39th, 40th, 42nd, 50th, 66th Corps; totalling 250,000 men. About 3 million Chinese civilian and military personnel had served in Korea throughout the war.

Background 

Although the United Nations Command (UN) forces were under United States command, this army was officially a UN "police" force. In order to avoid an open war with the US and other UN members, the People's Republic of China deployed the People's Liberation Army (PLA) under the name "volunteer army".

About the name, there were various opinions. According to some scholars during the mid 1990s, after the PRC made the strategic decision to send soldiers to Korea, the very first name of this army was "support army." However, Huang Yanpei, the vice premier of the Government Administration Council of the Central People's Government at that time, suggested that the name "support army" might cause the international community to assume that China was sending soldiers as an act of direct aggression against the United States. Therefore, the army's name was modified to "volunteer army" while different unit designations and footings were used instead, to give the impression that China did not intend to declare war against the US, but rather that Chinese soldiers were only present on Korean battlefields as individual volunteers. On the other hand, some recent studies show that the change was not only due to Huang's advice. Because much earlier on July 7, 1950, the name had already been changed to "volunteer army" by Chinese premier Zhou Enlai on his manuscript about the decision of the army's clothing and flags.

Despite arguments on the changing from "People's Support Army" to "People's Volunteer Army", the name was also a homage to the Korean Volunteer Army that had helped the Chinese communists during the Second Sino-Japanese War and the Chinese Civil War. It also managed to deceive the US intelligence and the UN about the size and nature of the Chinese forces that entered Korea. They later realized that the PVA was the PLA's North East Frontier Force (NEFF), with other PLA formations transferred under NEFF's command as the Korean War dragged on. But the result was that they still admitted the name, "People's Volunteer Army", in order to minimize the war within the Korean Peninsula and prevent escalation of the war.

Strengths and weaknesses

Clothing 

The PVA soldier was reasonably well clothed, in keeping with the PLA's guerrilla origin and egalitarian attitudes. All ranks wore a cotton or woolen green or khaki shirt and trousers combination with leaders' uniforms being different in cut.

Equipment 

The nominal strength of a PLA division was 9,500 men, with a regiment comprising 3,000 and a battalion consisting of 850. However, many divisions sent to Korea were below-strength while the divisions stationed opposite Taiwan were above-strength. There was also variation in organization and equipment as well as in the quantity and quality of the military equipment. Some of the PLA's equipment was from the Imperial Japanese Army or were captured from the Kuomintang (Nationalist Chinese) military forces. Some Czechoslovak-made weapons were also purchased on the open market by the PRC. During the PVA's first offensive (the so-called First Phase Campaign) in the Korean War between October and November 1950, large quantities of captured US weapons were widely used due to the availability of the required ammunition and the increasing difficulty of constant re-supplying across the Yalu River due to numerous UN-conducted air interdiction operations. In addition, there was also a local copy of the US Thompson submachine gun being produced by the PRC, based on the type of which had already been exported to and used in China since the 1930s and by UN troops during the Korean War as well. Later on, after the first year of the Korean War, the Soviet Union began to send more weapons and ammunition to the PRC, which started to produce licensed copies of some types of Soviet weapons , such as the PPSh-41 submachine gun, which was designated as the Type 50. In addition to surplus WWII Soviet arms, the Soviet Union also provided some WWII German small arms to the Chinese like the Karabiner 98k rifle. Surplus Mauser ammunition were also supplied by the Soviet Union or were available from stocks left behind by the KMT forces who also used German ammunition.

Actions during the Korean War

First Phase Campaign (October 25 – November 5, 1950)

The collapse of the North Korean Korean People's Army (KPA) in September/October 1950 following the Battle of Inchon, the Pusan Perimeter Offensive and the UN September 1950 counteroffensive alarmed the PRC Government. The PRC had issued warnings that they would intervene if any non-South Korean forces crossed the 38th Parallel, citing national security interests. US President Harry Truman regarded the warnings as "a bold attempt to blackmail the UN". On October 8, 1950, the day after UN troops crossed the 38th Parallel and began their offensive into North Korea, Chairman Mao issued the order for the NEFF to be moved to the Yalu River, ready to cross. Mao sought Soviet aid and saw intervention as essentially defensive: "If we allow the U.S. to occupy all of Korea... we must be prepared for the US to declare... war with China", he told Soviet leader Joseph Stalin. Zhou Enlai was sent to Moscow to add force to Mao's cabled arguments. Mao delayed his forces while waiting for Soviet help, and the planned attack was thus postponed from 13 October to 19 October. The MiG-15s in PRC colours would be an unpleasant surprise to the UN pilots; they would hold local air superiority against the F-80 Shooting Stars until newer F-86 Sabres were deployed. The Soviet role was known to the US but they kept quiet to avoid any international and potential nuclear incidents. It has been alleged by the Chinese that the Soviets had agreed to full scale air support, which never occurred south of Pyongyang, and helped accelerate the Sino-Soviet split.

On October 15, 1950, Truman went to Wake Island to discuss with UN commander General Douglas MacArthur the possibility of Chinese intervention and his desire to limit the scope of the Korean War. MacArthur reassured Truman that "if the Chinese tried to get down to Pyongyang there would be the greatest slaughter."

On October 19, 1950, Pyongyang, North Korea's capital, was captured by UN forces. On the same day, the PVA formally crossed the Yalu River under strict secrecy.

The initial PVA assault began on October 25, 1950, under the command of Peng Dehuai with 270,000 PVA troops (it was assumed at the time that Lin Biao was in charge, but this notion had been disproved). The PVA assault caught the UN troops by surprise, and employing great skill and remarkable camouflage ability, concealed their numerical and divisional strength after the first engagement with the UN. After these initial engagements, the Chinese withdrew into the mountains. UN forces interpreted this withdrawal as a show of weakness; they thought that this initial attack was all that the Chinese forces were capable of undertaking.

Second Phase Campaign (November 25 – December 24, 1950)

On November 25, 1950, in the Second Phase Offensive (or campaign) the PVA struck again along the entire Korean front. In the west, at the Battle of the Ch'ongch'on River, the PVA overran several UN divisions and landed an extremely heavy blow into the flank of the remaining UN forces, decimating the U.S. 2nd Infantry Division in the process. In December 1950, Chinese forces captured Pyongyang. The city saw a massive evacuation of refugees alongside UN forces heading south in order to avoid the advancing PVA. The resulting UN retreat from North Korea was the longest retreat of an American unit in history. In the east, at the Battle of Chosin Reservoir, Task Force Faith – a 3,000 man unit from the 7th Infantry Division – was surrounded by the PVA 80th and the 81st Divisions. Task Force Faith managed to inflict heavy casualties onto the PVA divisions, but in the end it was destroyed with 2,000 men killed or captured, and losing all vehicles and most other equipment. The destruction of Task Force Faith was considered by the PVA to be their biggest success of the entire Korean War. The 1st Marine Division fared better; though surrounded and forced to retreat, they inflicted heavy casualties on the PVA, who committed six divisions trying to destroy the Marines. Although the PVA were able to recapture much of North Korea during the Second Phase Campaign, 40 percent of the PVA was rendered combat ineffective—a loss which they could not recover from until the start of Chinese Spring Offensive.

UN forces in northeast Korea withdrew to form a defensive perimeter around the port city of Hŭngnam, where an evacuation was carried out in late December 1950. Approximately 100,000 military personnel and material and another 100,000 North Korean civilians were loaded onto a variety of merchant and military transport ships. Eighth Army commander General Walton Walker was killed in an accident on December 23, 1950. He was replaced by Lieutenant General Matthew Ridgway, who led airborne troops in the Second World War.

Third Phase Campaign (December 31, 1950 – January 8, 1951)

Hoping to pressure the UN into abandoning South Korea, Mao ordered the PVA to attack the UN forces along the 38th Parallel. On the last day of 1950, PVA/KPA forces attacked several ROK divisions along the parallel, breaching the UN defenses in the process. To avoid another encirclement, UN forces evacuated Seoul on January 3, and PVA/KPA forces recaptured the city on January 4. Both the US Eighth Army and the US X Corps retreated another , but the overextended PVA were completely exhausted after months of nonstop fighting. Ridgway took immediate steps to raise the morale and fighting spirit of the battered Eighth Army, which had fallen to low levels during its retreat from North Korea.

Fourth Phase Campaign (January 30 – April 21, 1951)
The overextended PVA were forced to disengage and to recuperate for an extensive period of time, but the UN forces soon returned to the offensive. On January 23, 1951, the US Eighth Army launched Operation Thunderbolt, attacking the unprepared PVA/KPA forces south of the Han River. This was followed up with Operation Roundup by US X Corps in central Korea. Hoping to regain the initiative, the PVA counterattacked at the Battle of Hoengsong on February 11, stopping US X Corps' advance in the process. But without proper rest and recuperation, the new offensive soon fizzled out at the Battle of Chipyong-ni on February 15. With the entire PVA incapable of any further offensive operations, the US Eighth Army launched Operation Killer on February 21, followed by Operation Ripper on March 6. A revitalized Eighth Army, restored by Ridgway to fighting trim, expelled the PVA/KPA troops from Seoul on 16 March, destroying much of the city with aerial and artillery bombardments in the process.

MacArthur was removed from command by President Truman on April 11, 1951, due to a disagreement over policy. MacArthur was succeeded by Ridgway, who led the UN forces for additional offensives across the 38th Parallel. A series of attacks managed to slowly drive back the opposing forces, inflicting heavy casualties on PVA/KPA units as UN forces advanced some miles north of the 38th parallel to Line Kansas.

Fifth Phase Campaign (April 22 – May 22, 1951)

The PVA counterattacked on 22 April 1951 with the Fifth Phase Campaign (also known as the "Chinese Spring Offensive") and with three field armies (approximately 700,000 men). The offensive's first thrust fell upon US I Corps and IX Corps which fiercely resisted, blunting the impetus of the offensive, which was halted at the No-Name Line north of Seoul. On May 15, 1951, the PVA commenced the second impulse of the Spring Offensive and attacked the ROK and the US X Corps in the east, and initially were successful, yet were halted by May 22. On 20 May the US Eighth Army counterattacked the exhausted PVA/KPA forces in the UN May-June 1951 counteroffensive, inflicting heavy losses. The destruction of the PVA 180th Division of the 60th Army during the counterattack has been considered to be the worst Chinese defeat during the entire Korean War. Roughly 3,000 men managed to escape (including the division commander and other high-ranking officers), but the majority of the division were killed or captured. During the final days of the Fifth Phase Campaign, the main body of the 180th Division was encircled during a UN counterattack, and after days of hard fighting, the division was fragmented, and the regiments fled in all directions. Soldiers either deserted or were abandoned by their officers during failed attempts to wage guerrilla warfare without support from the local people. Finally, out of ammunition and food, some 5,000 soldiers were captured. The division commander and other officers who escaped were subsequently investigated and demoted on return to China. The UN counterattack halted at Line Kansas where they were met with fresh troops from the counterattacking PVA 42nd and 47th Corps on 27 May, and subsequent offensive action stand-down began the stalemate that lasted until the armistice of 1953.

Stalemate (June 10, 1951 – July 27, 1953)

The UN counterattack in the aftermath of the Chinese Spring Offensive stabilized the front roughly along the 38th Parallel. The rest of the war involved little territory change, large-scale bombing of the population in the north, and lengthy peace negotiations, which started in Kaesong on July 10, 1951. Even during the peace negotiations, combat continued. For the UN forces, the goal was to recapture all of what had been South Korea before an agreement was reached in order to avoid loss of any territory and the PVA attempted similar operations. A major issue of the negotiations was repatriation of POWs. The Chinese and North Koreans insisted on forcible repatriation, while the UN insisted on voluntary repatriation. The war continued until the Chinese and North Koreans eventually dropped this issue.

On November 29, 1952, U.S. President-elect Dwight D. Eisenhower fulfilled a campaign promise by going to Korea to find out what could be done to end the war. With the UN's and PVA's acceptance of India's proposal for an armistice, fighting ended July 27, 1953, by which time the front line was back around the proximity of the 38th Parallel. A demilitarized zone (DMZ) was established along the Military Demarcation Line, which is patrolled to this day by North Korean troops on one side and South Korean and American troops on the other.

Tactics 
PVA forces used rapid attacks on the flanks and rear and infiltration behind UN lines to give the appearance of vast hordes. This, of course, was augmented by the PVA tactic of maximizing their forces for the attack, ensuring a large local numerical superiority over their opponent. The initial PVA victories were a great morale booster for the PVA. However, by late 1951, overextended supply lines and superior UN firepower had forced a stalemate. The KPA that invaded in 1950 had been much better supplied and armed by the Soviets than the PVA had been. The main arms of the PVA were captured Japanese and Nationalist arms.

Historian and Korean War veteran Bevin Alexander had this to say about Chinese tactics in his book How Wars Are Won:

The Chinese had no air power and were armed only with rifles, machineguns, hand grenades, and mortars. Against the much more heavily armed Americans, they adapted a technique they had used against the Nationalists in the Chinese civil war of 1946–49. The Chinese generally attacked at night and tried to close in on a small troop position—generally a platoon—and then attacked it with local superiority in numbers. The usual method was to infiltrate small units, from a platoon of fifty men to a company of 200, split into separate detachments. While one team cut off the escape route of the Americans, the others struck both the front and the flanks in concerted assaults. The attacks continued on all sides until the defenders were destroyed or forced to withdraw. The Chinese then crept forward to the open flank of the next platoon position, and repeated the tactics.

Roy Appleman further clarified the initial Chinese tactics as:
In the First Phase Offensive, highly skilled enemy light infantry troops had carried out the Chinese attacks, generally unaided by any weapons larger than mortars. Their attacks had demonstrated that the Chinese were well-trained disciplined fire fighters, and particularly adept at night fighting. They were masters of the art of camouflage. Their patrols were remarkably successful in locating the positions of the U.N. forces. They planned their attacks to get in the rear of these forces, cut them off from their escape and supply roads, and then send in frontal and flanking attacks to precipitate the battle. They also employed a tactic which they termed Hachi Shiki, which was a V-formation into which they allowed enemy forces to move; the sides of the V then closed around their enemy while another force moved below the mouth of the V to engage any forces attempting to relieve the trapped unit. Such were the tactics the Chinese used with great success at Onjong, Unsan, and Ch'osan, but with only partial success at Pakch'on and the Ch'ongch'on bridgehead.

Discipline and political control 
The discipline of the PVA was strict by Western standards, a notable improvement when compared to the Nationalist and warlord armies that ruled the country from 1912 until 1949. Discipline was applied universally within the army, with the Chinese Communist Party (CCP) members expected to be punished more than non-Party soldiers for the same infraction. Beatings and abuses were forbidden by regulations. Although capital punishment was enforced for disobeying certain orders, it was rarely used in accordance with the Chinese traditions. Normally, public shamings and political indoctrination camps were the preferred methods for dealing with serious infractions such as desertion, and the punished were expected to return to frontline duty with their original units.

Like the Soviet Army, political and military officers formed a dual chain of command within the PVA, and this arrangement could be found as low as the company level. Political officers were in charge of the control and the morale of the troops, and they were often expected to act like role models in combat. Unlike other communist armies of the same period, although the political officers had authority over military officers on combat decisions, the military officers could issue orders without political officers' approval. Similarly, the line between military and political officers were often blurred in the PVA, since the political officers often had extensive military experiences while most military officers were senior Party members within a unit.

Besides the political officers, Party members and Party candidates also enforced political controls within the ranks. Squads were often divided into three-man fireteams, with each fireteam led by a Party member or a Party candidate. Group meetings were frequently used to maintain unit cohesion, and within the meetings public shamings and criticisms were conducted to raise morale and to indoctrinate soldiers.

The by-product of the tight political control within the PVA is that it relied on the presence of the Party members within its ranks to be combat effective. A PVA unit could disintegrate once the Party members were either killed or wounded in action. Also, the tight political control created a general dissatisfaction amongst the Chinese ranks. Constant political indoctrination and high peer pressure were required to maintain high morale for each soldier.

According to The Korean War, written by Matthew Bunker Ridgway, the commander-in-chief of the UN forces, the positive evaluation of the Chinese Army's good treatment of prisoners is completely different from the KPA's policy of abusing prisoners. He positively praised the Chinese army as a disciplined army and a respectable enemy. During the Korean War, the US front-line combat forces also spoke highly of the fighting will of the PVA.

Prisoners-of-war (POWs) 
Prisoners-of-war (POWs) played a major role in the continuation of the war past 1951. The US accused China of implementing mind control, coined "brainwashing", on US prisoners, while China refused to allow the US to repatriate POWs to Taiwan.

United Nations POWs 
In contrast with their KPA counterparts, executions committed by the PVA were rather few in number. According to author Kevin Mahoney in his study of the PVA, executions of POWs did occur during the heat of the battle. Most of the executions appeared to have been committed by the lower commands without the upper echelons' knowledge, and it is often carried out to prevent the future escapes or rescues of the POWs.

As the PVA rarely executed prisoners, the Chinese considered themselves to be more lenient and humane than the KPA. However, the Chinese were unprepared for the large influx of POWs after their entry into the war and a large number of prisoners were crowded into temporary camps for processing. Mass starvation and diseases soon swept through those camps during the winter of 1950–51, while numerous death marches were conducted by the PVA to move the prisoners into permanent locations. Although the situation started to improve after permanent camps were established by January 1951, death by starvation still continued until April 1951. About 43 percent of all US POWs died from November 1950 to April 1951. In comparison, only 34 percent of all US prisoners died under Japanese captivity during World War II. The Chinese have defended their actions by stating that all PVA soldiers during this period were also suffering mass starvation and diseases due to the lack of a competent logistics system. The UN POWs, however, pointed out that a lot of the Chinese camps were located near the Sino-Korean border, and claimed that the starvation was used to force the prisoners to accept the communist indoctrination programs. The starvation and the POW deaths finally stopped by the summer of 1951 after the armistice talks started.

Allegations of mind control 

During the Korean War, Edward Hunter, who worked at the time both as a journalist and as a U.S. intelligence agent, wrote a series of books and articles on the allegations of Chinese mind control, which he coined as "brainwashing".

The Chinese term 洗腦 (xǐnǎo, literally "wash brain") was originally used to describe methodologies of coercive persuasion used under the Maoist regime in China, which aimed to transform individuals with a reactionary imperialist mindset into "right-thinking" members of the new Chinese social system. To that end the regime developed techniques that would break down the psyche integrity of the individual with regard to information processing, information retained in the mind and individual values. Chosen techniques included dehumanizing of individuals by keeping them in filth, sleep deprivation, partial sensory deprivation, psychological harassment, inculcation of guilt and group social pressure. The term punned on the Taoist custom of "cleansing/washing the heart" (洗心, xǐ xīn) prior to conducting certain ceremonies or entering certain holy places.

Hunter and those who picked up the Chinese term used it to explain why, unlike in earlier wars, a relatively high percentage of American GIs defected to the enemy side after becoming prisoners-of-war. It was believed that the Chinese in North Korea used such techniques to disrupt the ability of captured troops to effectively organize and resist their imprisonment. British radio operator Robert W. Ford and British army Colonel James Carne also claimed that the Chinese subjected them to brainwashing techniques during their war-era imprisonment.

After the war, two studies of the repatriation of American prisoners of war by Robert Lifton and by Edgar Schein concluded that brainwashing (called "thought reform" by Lifton and "coercive persuasion" by Schein) had a transient effect. Both researchers found that the Chinese mainly used coercive persuasion to disrupt the ability of the prisoners to organize and maintain morale and hence to escape. By placing the prisoners under conditions of physical and social deprivation and disruption, and then by offering them more comfortable situations such as better sleeping quarters, better food, warmer clothes or blankets, the Chinese did succeed in getting some of the prisoners to make anti-American statements. Nevertheless, the majority of prisoners did not actually adopt Communist beliefs, instead behaving as though they did in order to avoid the plausible threat of extreme physical abuse. Both researchers also concluded that such coercive persuasion succeeded only on a minority of POWs, and that the end-result of such coercion remained very unstable, as most of the individuals reverted to their previous condition soon after they left the coercive environment. In 1961 they both published books expanding on these findings. Schein published Coercive Persuasion and Lifton published Thought Reform and the Psychology of Totalism. More recent writers including Mikhail Heller have suggested that Lifton's model of brainwashing may throw light on the use of mass propaganda in other communist states such as the former Soviet Union.

In a summary published in 1963, Edgar Schein gave a background history of the precursor origins of the brainwashing phenomenon:

Thought reform contains elements which are evident in Chinese culture (emphasis on interpersonal sensitivity, learning by rote and self-cultivation); in methods of extracting confessions well known in the Papal Inquisition (13th century) and elaborated through the centuries, especially by the Russian secret police; in methods of organizing corrective prisons, mental hospitals and other institutions for producing value change; in methods used by religious sects, fraternal orders, political elites or primitive societies for converting or initiating new members. Thought reform techniques are consistent with psychological principles but were not explicitly derived from such principles.

Mind-control theories from the Korean War era came under criticism in subsequent years. According to forensic psychologist Dick Anthony, the CIA invented the concept of "brainwashing" as a propaganda strategy to undercut communist claims that American POWs in Korean communist camps had voluntarily expressed sympathy for communism. Anthony stated that definitive research demonstrated that fear and duress, not brainwashing, caused western POWs to collaborate. He argued that the books of Hunter (whom he identified as a secret CIA "psychological warfare specialist" passing as a journalist) pushed the CIA brainwashing theory onto the general public.

In addition, Herbert Brownell Jr., the Attorney General of the United States, once said publicly that "if American prisoners of war cooperate with the Communist Party during their imprisonment in North Korea, they will face charges of treason that may carry out the death penalty. Moreover, the United States official wrote a statement saying: "Those who cooperate with Communists and sign false confessions should be quickly removed from the army, not honored." In addition to threats and pressure by the U.S. government and military, prisoners of war also face great psychological pressure from the impact of their families. This may explain why many American prisoners of war accused "China of abusing prisoners of war" or why they recanted statements in favor of the People's Republic of China after returning home.

Chinese POWs

Anti-communist POWs in communist service
During the Panmunjom Truce negotiations, the chief stumbling block to the arrangement of a final armistice during the winter of 1951–1952 revolved around the exchange of prisoners. At first glance, there appeared to be nothing to argue about, since the Geneva Conventions of 1949, by which both sides had pledged to abide, called for the immediate and complete exchange of all prisoners upon the conclusion of hostilities. This seemingly straightforward principle, however, disturbed many Americans. To begin with, UN prisoner-of-war camps held over 40,000 South Koreans, many of whom had been impressed into communist service and who had no desire to be sent north upon the conclusion of the war. Moreover, a considerable number of North Korean and Chinese prisoners had also expressed a desire not to return to their homelands. This was particularly true of the Chinese POWs, some of whom were anti-communists whom the communists had forcibly inducted during the Chinese Civil War into the PLA unit that was later transferred into Korea.

Aftermath of the Korean War 

In 2011, some former members of the PVA revisited North Korea. After the visit, they commented that they were "very sad" and dissatisfied with the post-war development of North Korea. "[We] liberated them, but they're still struggling for freedom" said Qu Yingkui.

To mark the 70th year of entry into the Korean War by the volunteers' army, North Korean leader Kim Jong-un visited the cemetery in 2020. The Pyongyang Times described the soldiers as having 'unparalleled bravery, mass spirit and international heroism,' and describing the other help that the volunteer army provided.

Early Chinese involvement 

The stated historical importance of the PVA entering the war was that it marked the beginning of Chinese government involvement. However, this is rather from political propaganda needs and there is debate of the time of the beginning of Chinese involvement. Some scholars in the west had argued that the Chinese involvement was much earlier, and in the North Korean invasion on June 25, 1950, out of the 135,000 KPA invasion force, more than 38,000 were former ethnic Korean soldiers of the Chinese Communist Fourth Field Army. An equal number of former ethnic Korean soldiers of Fourth Field Army who did not participate in the invasion also served in the KPA in other regions of North Korea. The KPA invasion force consisted of two corps, the I Corps and II Corps. Jin Xiong (金雄, Kim Woong), the commander-in-chief of the invasion force and the commander of KPA I Corps, was a veteran of Eighth Route Army, and a former member of the CCP. Jin Wuting (金武亭, Kim Mu Jong), also known as Wu Ting (武亭, Mu Jong) the commander of KPA II Corps, even had more seniority than Jin Xiong (金雄), in that he participated in Guangzhou Uprising and the Long March. All of these facts are agreed by the Chinese government.

The former units of the Fourth Field Army transferred to North Korean with all of their weapons were:

5th Division (North Korea): former 164th Division. The commander, Li Deshan (李德山), a veteran of Eighth Route Army and former member of the CCP, was also the political commissar. When the division reached to North Korea on July 20, 1949, its number totaled 10,821. Weaponry brought with them included 5,279 rifles, 588 handguns, 321 light machine guns, 104 heavy machine guns, 206 submachine guns, 8 anti-tank rifles, 32 grenade launchers, 67 50-mm mortars, 87 60-mm mortars, 26 mortars with calibre of 81-mm or greater, 12 anti-tank guns, 1 infantry support gun, 3 other artillery pieces and 734 horses.
6th Division (North Korea): former 166th Division. The commander, Fang Hushan (方虎山, Bang Ho San), a veteran of Eighth Route Army and former member of the CCP, was also the political commissar. When the division reached to North Korea on July 20, 1949, its number totaled 10,320. Weaponry brought with them included: 6,046 rifles, 722 handguns, 281 light machine guns, 91 heavy machine guns, 878 submachine guns, 69 grenade launchers, 31 50-mm mortars, 91 60-mm mortars, 33 mortars with calibre of 81-mm or greater, 10 anti-tank guns, 3 mountain guns, 3 other artillery pieces and 945 horses.
7th Division (North Korea) (later renamed as the 12th): former 156th Division, with additional ethnic Korean soldiers from the 139th, 140th and 141st Divisions of the IV Field Army. The commander, Cui Ren (崔仁, Chu Yol), a veteran of Eighth Route Army and former member of the CCP, was also the political commissar. When the division reached North Korea on April 18, 1950, its number totaled more than 14,000. The weaponry brought into North Korea was greater than that of the other two divisions due to its larger size.

With the exception of the KPA 2nd and 3rd Divisions, which mostly consisted of former-Soviet trained North Korean troops, all other KPA divisions had at least a former regiment of the IV Field Army, and in addition to the three former Chinese divisions, most of commanders were former commanders of the IV Field army, such as:
Commander of the 2nd Division Ch'oe Hyon (崔贤) and chief-of-staff Xu Bo (许波)
Commander of the 3rd Division Lee Yong Ho (李英镝) and chief-of-staff Zhang Pingshan (张平山)
Commander of the 4th Division Lee Kwon Mu (李权武)

Though the Chinese government acknowledged these facts, this early Chinese involvement was kept a secret for more than four decades in China and it was only until the late 1990s when such information was finally allowed to be revealed on large scale. The Chinese government, however, argued that these troops were already transferred to North Korea and thus should be strictly considered as the internal affairs of Korea, and thus still asserts the Chinese involvement in the Korean War began when the PVA joined the fight.

Legacy

Democratic People's Republic of Korea 
The legacy of the PVA is commemorated in the DPRK with the Cemetery of the Fallen Soldiers of the Chinese People's Volunteers Army, located in Hoechang County. Wreaths and floral baskets are sent to commemorate their contributions to the war.

People's Republic of China 
For many Chinese, the Korean War is generally regarded as an honorable struggle in Chinese history. The PVA was the first Chinese army in a century that was able to withstand a Western army in a major conflict. They had earned a name "the most beloved people (最可爱的人)", which is from the essay written by Wei Wei in 1951, "Who are the Most Beloved People?". More and more stories of heroism by members of the PVA continue to be promoted by the PRC government even to this day, and appear in school textbooks. The willingness of China to assist North Korea against the United States, and the show of force they engaged in, heralded that China was once again becoming a major world power.

From official Chinese sources, PVA casualties during the Korean War were 390,000. This breaks down as follows: 110,400 KIA; 21,600 died of wounds; 13,000 died of sickness; 25,600 MIA/POW; and 260,000 more wounded. However, western and other sources estimate that about 400,000 Chinese soldiers were either killed in action or died of disease, starvation, exposure, and accidents with around 486,000 wounded, out of around 3 million military personnel deployed in the war by China. Mao Zedong's oldest and only healthy son, Mao Anying (毛岸英), was a PVA officer during the war, and was killed by a UN air strike.

The war also contributed to the decline of Sino-Soviet relations. Although Chinese had their own reasons to enter the war (i.e. a strategic buffer state in the Korean peninsula), the view that the Soviets had used them as proxies was shared in the Western bloc. China had to use Soviet loans originally intended to rebuild their shattered economy to pay for Soviet arms.

Republic of China 

After the war was over, of the PVA POWs held by UNC forces, 14,235 were transported to Taiwan. They began arriving in Taiwan on January 23, 1954 and were referred to as "Anti-Communist Martyrs" (反共義士). In Taiwan January 23 became World Freedom Day (自由日) in their honor.

The Korean War also led to other long-lasting effects. Until the war, the US had largely abandoned the government of Chiang Kai-shek, which had retreated to Taiwan, and had no plans to intervene in the Chinese Civil War. The start of the Korean War rendered untenable any policy that would have caused Taiwan to fall under PRC control. Truman's decision to send American forces to the Taiwan Strait further deterred the PRC from making any cross-strait invasion of Taiwan. The anti-communist atmosphere in the West in response to the Korean War and Cold War contributed to the unwillingness to diplomatically recognize the People's Republic of China by the United States until 1979. Today, diplomacy between the Republic of China and mainland China remains strained, and mainland China continues to claim the sovereignty of Taiwan.

Media 

Who are the Most Beloved People? is the title of an essay by Chinese writer Wei Wei about the Chinese soldiers serving in the Korean War. It is considered to be the most famous literary and propaganda piece produced by China during the Korean War.

Battle on Shangganling Mountain is a famous Chinese war movie about the Battle of Triangle Hill. The story is centered around a group of Chinese soldiers that were trapped in a tunnel for several days. Short of both food and water, they hold their grounds till the relief troops arrive. The movie's popularity is largely due to the fact it was one of the few movies that were not banned during the Cultural Revolution.

War Trash is a novel by the Chinese author Ha Jin, who has long lived in the United States and who writes in English. It takes the form of a memoir written by the fictional character Yu Yuan, a man who eventually becomes a soldier in the Chinese People's Volunteer Army and who is sent to Korea to fight on the Communist side in the Korean War. The majority of the "memoir" is devoted to describing this experience, especially after Yu Yuan is captured and imprisoned as a POW. The novel captured the PEN/Faulkner Award and was a finalist for the Pulitzer Prize.

See also 
 Cold War
 People's Liberation Army
 Korean War

Notes

References

Citations

Sources 

 
 
 
 
 
 
 
 
 
 
 
 part 2
 
 
 
 
 
 
 
 
 

 
China
Expatriate military units and formations
Expeditionary units and formations
Military units and formations established in 1950
Military units and formations disestablished in 1994